Winter Brothers is a 2017 Danish drama film directed by Hlynur Pálmason. It was screened in the Discovery section at the 2017 Toronto International Film Festival, and won the 2018 Bodil Award for Best Danish Film. At the 2018 Robert Awards, the film won both the Robert Award for Best Danish Film as well as eight other merit awards: Pàlmason for Best Director, Crosset Hove for Best Actor, Carmen Sonne for Best Supporting Actress, as well as the Roberts for Best Cinematography, Best Production Design, Best Sound Design, Best Costume Design, and the Robert Award for Best Makeup.

Cast

Reception 
Winter Brothers debuted in the Concorso internazionale section at the 2017 Locarno Film Festival on 3 August 2017.

Critical response 
On review aggregator website Rotten Tomatoes, the film holds an approval rating of 89%, based on 9 reviews, and an average rating of 7.5/10.

Film critic Jessica Kiang of Variety magazine wrote in her review: "... while we may not always know what Pálmason means, there's the undeniable sense that he does, and mostly, that's enough to add up to an impressively original, auspiciously idiosyncratic debut, one that scratches away at truths about masculinity, lovelessness and isolation, that are no less true for being all but inexpressible. Instead, we have to hunt for them, like we’re mining elusive, subterranean seams of meaning, that even the brightest flashlight can only ever partially illuminate." Film critic Neil Young of The Hollywood Reporter wrote in his review: "Chilly scenes of workplace discord dominate Winter Brothers (Vinterbrodre), a confidently handled, promisingly edgy feature debut from Copenhagen-based, Icelandic writer-director Hlynur Palmason."

Accolades

References

External links 
 
 

2017 drama films
2017 films
Best Danish Film Bodil Award winners
Best Danish Film Robert Award winners
Danish drama films
2010s Danish-language films
Films directed by Hlynur Pálmason